Ravi Tandon (17 February 1935 – 11 February 2022) was an Indian film director and producer. He also worked as an assistant director and story writer. He is the father of actress Raveena Tandon.

Ravi Tandon directed a number of hit movies, the most popular among these are Khel Khel Mein, Anhonee, Nazrana, Majboor, Khud-daar, Zindagi. Ravi Tandon was born in a Punjabi family in Agra. Tandon and his wife Veena had a son Rajeev, a producer and director who made the television series Heena, and a daughter, film actress Raveena Tandon. His directorial venture Nazrana with Rajesh Khanna in the lead was the 5th highest grosser of the year in 1987. He died of respiratory failure at his residence in Mumbai on 11 February 2022, at the age of 86, just six days before his 87th birthday. He had pulmonary fibrosis in the last few years of his life.

Filmography

References

External links
 

1935 births
2022 deaths
20th-century Indian film directors
Film directors from Uttar Pradesh
Film producers from Uttar Pradesh
Hindi film producers
Hindi-language film directors
People from Agra